The U.S. Senate Environment and Public Works Subcommittee on Children's Health was a subcommittee of the U.S. Senate Committee on Environment and Public Works.

Jurisdiction

According to the Committee's website:

Responsibility for policy issues in connection with protection of pregnant women, infants and children from environmental hazards.

Members, 112th Congress
The subcommittee is chaired by Democrat Tom Udall of New Mexico, and the Ranking Minority Member is Republican Lamar Alexander of Tennessee.

See also

Environment and Public Works Subcommittee on Children's Health and Environmental Responsibility